Tyler James Hilton (born November 22, 1983) is an American singer-songwriter and actor. Hilton began his professional career in music in 2000. Rolling Stone magazine compared him to his contemporary, Howie Day, while others have compared Hilton to Elton John, both vocally and instrumentally.

Since the release of his debut album, Hilton has ventured into acting, guest starring on The CW's One Tree Hill as the talented but arrogant Chris Keller, and playing the role of Elvis Presley in the Johnny Cash biopic Walk the Line. He also appeared in Taylor Swift's music video "Teardrops on My Guitar" and Gloriana's music video "(Kissed You) Good Night".

Early years and personal life
Hilton was born in Palm Springs, California, the son of Kristy (née Herren) and Robert George Hilton. Raised in Bermuda Dunes, California, Hilton grew up around music and began teaching himself Elvis Presley songs at an early age. After a brief stint in Northern California, his family moved back to the Palm Springs area, where he wrote his first song about a girl named Rhian with whom he attended school. Hilton's family made another move back to Coachella Valley for high school, where, at La Quinta High School, he started a band with some of his classmates. The band did not go anywhere, so Hilton began to enter open mic nights and went to local coffee shops to play his own music.

Hilton lives in Los Angeles. He became engaged to Canadian actress Megan Park, whom he met on the set of Charlie Bartlett, in 2006, and they married on October 10, 2015. The couple has one daughter, born on December 20, 2019.

Music career 
Hilton heard a local radio station was giving away Jonny Lang concert tickets and called into The Mark & Brian radio show on KLOS in Los Angeles at the age of 16. While on the phone, he sang an a cappella version of Jonny Lang’s song "Breakin' Me".  Mark & Brian were so impressed with Hilton's performance that they gave him a spot at the station's Christmas concert. Word of Hilton caught the ear of Maverick Records (owned by Warner Bros. Records), who signed him up with a record deal when he was 18. Hilton released a self-titled EP on April 6, 2004. All four songs were included on his first album The Tracks of Tyler Hilton released on September 28, 2004. After the release of his album, Hilton joined the likes of Avril Lavigne, Jet, 50 Cent, and Josh Groban as an artist chosen by AOL Breaker for his star potential.

In addition to his own albums, Hilton has also appeared on each of the three different One Tree Hill soundtrack albums, some with formerly unreleased material that cannot be found anywhere else. Most notably, the cover of the Ryan Adams song "When the Stars Go Blue", which was arranged into a duet with One Tree Hill star Bethany Joy Lenz for the show; also, a cover of "Missing You" by John Waite and the original track "You'll Ask For Me". In 2005, he was part of a 23-city concert tour along with Lenz, The Wreckers and Gavin Degraw. During the summer of that year, he opened for Hilary Duff on her "Still Most Wanted Tour".

His EP, Better on Beachwood, which features three songs was released in May 2009. Ladies & Gentlemen, another EP followed in April 2010 and features five songs. Both EPs are available on iTunes.

For five years, Hilton worked on an album called The Storms We Share. The album, containing some songs of Ladies & Gentlemen, was planned to be released in the late summer of 2010. However, when the direction changed at Warner Bros. Records, Hilton left the label resulting in the material not being released.
 
On June 27, 2011, Tyler Hilton's song "Faithful" was released on the soundtrack of Larry Crowne.

On January 11, 2012, Hilton released a free song called "Loaded Gun" from his upcoming album Forget the Storm on his website and was featured in the season 9 premiere episode of One Tree Hill following his return as Chris Keller. Hilton also debuted two songs from the album called "Kicking My Heels" and "Prince of Nothing Charming" on the show. On February 14, 2012, "Prince of Nothing Charming", the first single from Hilton's upcoming album Forget the Storm, was made available on iTunes. On March 7, 2012, Hilton revealed via Twitter that Forget The Storm, his first full-length LP since 2004, would be released on April 3, 2012. The album was produced by David Hodges among others and released through Hilton's own label, Hooptie Tune Records. He chose to title it "Forget the Storm" as a reference to his unreleased album, "The Storms We Share", and described it as "a little more rock and roll." Hilton began a tour in the United States with Dion Roy and "Dakota and Will" in March 2012 which ended mid June 2012. He also toured with Boyce Avenue in the UK and Ireland in June 2012 until July 2012 and will return late October 2012 on his own headlining tour after more US shows, wrapping up the year with shows back in the US. On December 7, 2016, Hilton release a new single called "Next To You" on iTunes; It was recorded on his Forget The Storm Deluxe Version as an acoustic version.

In 2017, Tyler Hilton released his cover of "Stay" by Rihanna and released his most recent single "Overtime" on August 15, 2017.

Acting
After his stint as Chris Keller on One Tree Hill, Hilton went on to appear in the Academy Award-winning film Walk the Line as a young Elvis Presley. For the part, Hilton was given the opportunity to cover two Elvis songs for the film: "Milk Cow Blues" and "That's All Right". Both songs are featured on the film's award-winning soundtrack.

In 2007, Hilton played the love interest in country music artist Taylor Swift's music video for her song "Teardrops on My Guitar" and appeared in the 2008 film Charlie Bartlett. He was with Charlie Bartlett co-star and now wife Megan Park in the music video for the band Gloriana's song "(Kissed You) Good Night" released in January 2012.

Hilton also performed in a Season 4 episode of My Super Sweet Sixteen (Amberly) during a young girl's sweet 16 party. He also appeared on VH1's Single Ladies.

After a five-year break from One Tree Hill, Hilton returned as a regular for its ninth and final season.

In 2016, Hilton played Noah Casey, a billionaire love interest for the main character in Pitch.

Filmography

Discography

Albums
 Tyler Hilton (2000) US Heatseekers Albums No. 12 
 The Tracks Of (2004) US Heatseekers Albums No. 15
 Forget the Storm (2012) US #189; US Heatseekers Albums No. 2
 Live in Atlanta (2012)
 Forget the Storm – Deluxe edition (2013)
 Indian Summer (2014)
 City on Fire (2019)

EPs
 Better on Beachwood (2009)
 Ladies & Gentlemen (April 20, 2010)

Music videos

References

External links
 
 
Tyler Hilton collection at the Internet Archive's live music archive

1983 births
Living people
21st-century American male actors
21st-century American singers
21st-century American male singers
American male film actors
American male pop singers
American male television actors
American indie rock musicians
American pop rock singers
Male actors from Palm Springs, California
Musicians from Palm Springs, California
People from Bermuda Dunes, California
People from La Quinta, California
Singers from California
Maverick Records artists